HNLMS Callenburgh (F808) was a frigate of the . The ship was in service with the Royal Netherlands Navy from 1979 to 1994. The frigate was named after Dutch naval hero Gerard Callenburgh. The ship's radio call sign was "PADB".

Design and construction
In the early 1970s the Royal Netherlands Navy developed a 'Standard' frigate design to replace the destroyers of the - and es. The 'Standard' design would have anti-submarine (the ) and anti-aircraft (the ) variants with different armaments on a common hull design. The first eight Kortenaers were ordered in 1974, with four more ordered in 1976, although two were sold to Greece while being built, and replaced to two of the anti-aircraft variant.

Displacement was  standard and  full load. The ship was powered by two  Rolls-Royce Olympus TM 3B and two  Rolls-Royce Tyne TM 1C gas turbines in a combined gas or gas (COGOG) arrangement, driving two propeller shafts.

Callenburghs main anti-aircraft armament was an 8-round NATO Sea Sparrow surface-to-air missile launcher in front of the bridge. An OTO Melara 76 mm was fitted forward of the Sea Sparrow launcher, while a Goalkeeper CIWS was planned to be fitted aft, on the roof of the ship's hangar. Goalkeeper was not available when the ships were built, however, and Callenburgh was completed with a second Oto Melara 76 mm gun in its place. Eight Harpoon anti-ship missiles could be carried in two quadruple launchers, although two or four Harpoons was a more normal peacetime load-out. A hangar and fight deck were fitted to accommodate two Westland Lynx helicopters, although only one was normally carried. Close-in anti submarine armament was provided by four 324 mm tubes for US Mark 46 torpedoes. A Signaal LW-08 long-range air search radar was fitted, together with a ZW-06 surface-search radar, with WM-25 and STIR-180 fire control radars to direct the ship's armament. A Canadian SQS-505 hull-mounted sonar was fitted.

Callenburghs aft Oto Melara 76 mm gun was replaced by a Bofors 40 mm anti-aircraft gun in 1982, and this, in turn, was replaced by a prototype Goalkeeper installation in September 1984. On transfer to Greece, the Goalkeeper was removed. Greece replaced it by an American Phalanx CIWS, while Agusta-Bell AB 212 helicopters replaced the Lynxes.

HNLMS Callenburgh was laid down at the Koninklijke Maatschappij De Schelde (KM de Schelde) shipyard in Vlissingen on 30 June 1975. She was launched on 26 March 1977 and commissioned into service on 26 July 1979 with the Pennant number F 808.

Dutch service history
The ships returned on 19 June.
 
The ships returned to Den Helder on 19 May 1982.

Greek service history

The ship was sold to the Hellenic Navy on 30 March 1994, and commissioned under the name Adrias and with the pennant number F 459 on 30 June 1995. She was assigned the radio call sign "SZDT".

On 21 February 2021, USS Porter conducted an exercise with Adrias and 4 F-16s off southern Crete.

Notes

References

Kortenaer-class frigates
1977 ships
Ships built in Vlissingen
Frigates of the Cold War